Chandpur-5 is a constituency represented in the Jatiya Sangsad (National Parliament) of Bangladesh since 2008 by Rafiqul Islam of the Awami League.

Boundaries 
The constituency encompasses Hajiganj and Shahrasti upazilas.

History 
The constituency was created in 1984 from the Comilla-23 constituency when the former Comilla District was split into three districts: Brahmanbaria, Comilla, and Chandpur.

Members of Parliament

Elections

Elections in the 2010s 
Rafiqul Islam was re-elected unopposed in the 2014 general election after opposition parties withdrew their candidacies in a boycott of the election.

Elections in the 2000s

Elections in the 1990s

References

External links
 

Parliamentary constituencies in Bangladesh
Chandpur District